Protanguilla palau is a species of eel, the only species in the genus Protanguilla (first eel), which is in turn the only genus in its family, Protanguillidae. Individuals were found swimming in March 2010 in a deep underwater cave in a fringing reef off the coast of Palau.

Protanguillidae is a sister group to all other eels. They are monophyletic, yet also strongly synapomorphic with all other eel species. Molecular analysis shows that all other eels are also monophyletic, showing that they may have broken off directly from the Protanguillidae. For this reason it is known as a "living fossil".

Characteristics

The body is very small and slender, about 18 cm long. The eel has a second premaxilla and under 90 vertebrae, features previously found only in fossilised eels. Its full set of gill rakers in its branchial arches has never previously been found in an eel, but is common in bony fish. It is very different from all other living eels, and scientists estimate it must have diverged from the others around 200 million years ago, during the Mesozoic era. It thus has not only its own species, but also its own genus and family, as well, and has been referred to by scientists as a "living fossil".

References

External links

Youtube video

Eels
Fish of the Pacific Ocean
Monotypic fish genera
Fish described in 2012